The cantaloupe, rockmelon (Australia and New Zealand, although cantaloupe is used in some states of Australia), sweet melon, or spanspek (Southern Africa) is a melon that is a variety of the muskmelon species (Cucumis melo) from the family Cucurbitaceae.

Originally, cantaloupe referred only to the non-netted, orange-fleshed melons of Europe, but today may refer to any orange-fleshed melon of the C. melo species.

Etymology and origin
The name cantaloupe was derived in the 18th century via French  from The Cantus Region of Italian , which was formerly a papal county seat near Rome, after the fruit was introduced there from Armenia. It was first mentioned in English literature in 1739. The cantaloupe most likely originated in a region from South Asia to Africa. It was later introduced to Europe, and around 1890, became a commercial crop in the United States.

Melon derived from use in Old French as  during the 13th century, and from Medieval Latin , a kind of pumpkin. It was among the first plants to be domesticated and cultivated.

The South African English name  is said to be derived from Afrikaans  ('Spanish bacon'); supposedly, Sir Harry Smith, a 19th-century governor of Cape Colony, ate bacon and eggs for breakfast, while his Spanish-born wife  preferred cantaloupe, so South Africans nicknamed the eponymous fruit Spanish bacon. However, the name appears to predate the Smiths and date to 18th-century Dutch Suriname: J. van Donselaar wrote in 1770, " is the name for the form that grows in Suriname which, because of its thick skin and little flesh, is less consumed."

Types

The European cantaloupe, C. melo var. cantalupensis, is lightly ribbed with a sweet and flavorful flesh and a gray-green skin that looks quite different from that of the North American cantaloupe.

The North American cantaloupe, C. melo var. reticulatus, common in the United States, Mexico, and some parts of Canada, is a different variety of C. melo, a muskmelon with a reticulated ("net-like") peel. It is a round melon with firm, orange, moderately sweet flesh.

Production
In 2016, global production of melons, including cantaloupes, totaled 31.2 million tons, with China accounting for 51% of the world total (15.9 million tons). Other significant countries growing cantaloupe were Turkey, Iran, Egypt, and India producing 1 to 1.9 million tons, respectively.

California grows 75% of the cantaloupes in the US.

Consumption

Cantaloupe is normally eaten as a fresh fruit, as a salad, or as a dessert with ice cream or custard. Melon pieces wrapped in prosciutto are a familiar antipasto. The seeds are edible and may be dried for use as a snack.

Because the surface of a cantaloupe can contain harmful bacteria—in particular, Salmonella—it is recommended that a melon be washed and scrubbed thoroughly before cutting and consumption.  The fruit should be refrigerated after cutting it and consumed in less than three days to prevent risk of Salmonella or other bacterial pathogens.

A moldy cantaloupe in a Peoria, Illinois, market in 1943 was found to contain the highest yielding strain of mold for penicillin production, after a worldwide search.

Nutrition

Raw cantaloupe is 90% water, 8% carbohydrates, 0.8% protein and 0.2% fat, providing  and 2020 μg of the provitamin A orange carotenoid, beta-carotene per 100 grams. Fresh cantaloupe is a rich source (20% or more of the Daily Value, or DV) of vitamin C (44% DV) and vitamin A (21% DV), with other nutrients in negligible amounts (less than 10% DV) per 100 grams (see table).

See also 
 Melon

References

External links

Sorting Cucumis names– Multilingual multiscript plant name database

 
Melons
Crops originating from Asia
Taxa named by Nicolas Charles Seringe